Livai Kididromo (born c. 1959) is a Fijian former rugby union footballer, he played as a flanker. He was one of the Fiji players who took part in the 1987 Rugby World Cup.

Career
His first international cap was during the 1987 Rugby World Cup pool match against New Zealand national rugby union team at Christchurch on 27 May 1987. He played two matches during the tournament. His last cap for Fiji was during the match against Tonga at Nuku'alofa on 2 July 1988.

Notes

External links
 

Fiji international rugby union players
Fijian rugby union players
1959 births
Living people
Rugby union flankers
I-Taukei Fijian people